The 2017 World RX of Sweden, formally known as the 2017 Swecon World RX of Sweden, for sponsorship reasons, was the seventh round of the fourth season of the FIA World Rallycross Championship. The event was held at the Höljesbanan in the village of Höljes, Värmland and also hosted round six of the European Rallycross Championship and round four of the RX2 International Series, the main support category for the World Rallycross Championship.

Background
Reigning world champion and second in the 2017 standings, Mattias Ekström, was absent from the event due to his commitment in the DTM at the Norisring, held on the same weekend. Swedish rally driver Per-Gunnar Andersson was selected by EKS RX as Ekström's replacement, while Reinis Nitišs was nominated as the point scorer for EKS RX in the Teams' Championship, alongside Toomas Heikkinen.

Olsbergs MSE, who left the Championship in 2016, entered two  Ford Fiesta ST's for Sebastian Eriksson and Oliver Eriksson, but were ineligible to score points in the Teams' Championship. 

The attendance record was broken for the fourth year in a row, with 45,100 spectators, up from 44,400 in 2016.

Supercar

Heats

Semi-finals
Semi-Final 1

Semi-Final 2

Final

RX2 International Series

Heats

Semi-finals
Semi-Final 1

Semi-Final 2

Final

Standings after the event

Supercar standings

RX2 standings

 Note: Only the top five positions are included.

References

External links

|- style="text-align:center"
|width="35%"|Previous race:2017 World RX of Norway
|width="40%"|FIA World Rallycross Championship2017 season
|width="35%"|Next race:2017 World RX of Canada
|- style="text-align:center"
|width="35%"|Previous race:2016 World RX of Sweden
|width="40%"|World RX of Sweden
|width="35%"|Next race:2018 World RX of Sweden
|- style="text-align:center"

Sweden
World RX
World RX